WYRN (1480 AM) is a radio station broadcasting a news–talk format. Licensed to Louisburg, North Carolina, United States, it serves the Raleigh area.  The station is currently owned by Sadie Diana Alston, through licensee A and D Broadcasting, Inc.

History
At one time, WYRN aired the same programming as WKXU, which was previously WHLQ. Curtis Media Group purchased WHLQ and WYRN from Franklin Broadcasting in 2003.

References

External links

YRN
Franklin County, North Carolina